Summer Heat (Traditional Chinese: 心慌·心郁·逐個捉) is a TVB modern suspense series released overseas in January 2004 and broadcast on TVB Jade Channel in June 2006.

Synopsis
It's difficult to separate truth from lies, friends from enemies.
A peaceful village is ironically full of hidden dangers!

Shui Ling (Joyce Tang) grew up with just her father and they share a strong loving bond, but as Shui Ling grew older and put more time in her work their bond grew apart. To mend this bond, Shui Ling decides to visit her home village with his father. She was to meet with her father later that night at his yacht parked at the village's shore however it suddenly exploded when she approached. Shui Ling's boyfriend, Lau Hor-Fat (Mark Kwok), a police officer and his team could not find any trace of her father's remains. Shui Ling decides to stay at her family's home in the village to see why her father keeps visiting and to see if there were any signs of her father.

She meets the village leader, Ching Nai Hoi (Joe Ma), whom keeps irritating her and they have their differences. As her days past by in the village, she suspects that the villagers may be suspects to the yacht explosion. Hor Fat later eventually friends with Shing Ling and helps her question the villagers. She begins to fall in love with him but discovers that he is hiding a secret from her that has to do with her father's disappearance...

Cast

External links 
TVB.com Summer Heat - Official Website 

TVB dramas
2006 Hong Kong television series debuts
2006 Hong Kong television series endings